Amar Nath Agarwal  was an Indian politician. He was a Member of Parliament, representing Uttar Pradesh in the Rajya Sabha the upper house of India's Parliament representing the Indian National Congress

References

Rajya Sabha members from Uttar Pradesh
Indian National Congress politicians
1904 births
1981 deaths
Date of birth missing
Date of death missing
Indian National Congress politicians from Uttar Pradesh